Arsenic pentasulfide is an inorganic compound containing arsenic and sulfur.

Uses
Solids of the approximate formula As2S5 have been used as pigments and chemical intermediates but are generally only of interest in academic laboratories.

Preparation
Arsenic pentasulfide is prepared by precipitation from an acidic solution of soluble As(V) salts by treatment with hydrogen sulfide. It may be also prepared by heating a mixture of arsenic and sulfur, extracting the fused mass with an ammonia solution and reprecipitating arsenic pentasulfide at low temperature by addition of hydrochloric acid.

Phosphorus pentasulfide with the formula P4S10, is a molecular compound featuring tetrahedral phosphorus(V) centres.  Trends in arsenic redox potentials suggest that As2S5 adopts a similar structure, a plausible alternative being an arsenic polysulfide.

Reactions
Arsenic pentasulfide hydrolyzes in boiling water, giving arsenous acid and sulfur:
 As2S5 + 6 H2O → 2 H3AsO3 + 2 S + 3 H2S

It oxidizes in air at elevated temperatures producing arsenic oxides, the products and yields of which are variable. In alkali metal sulfide solutions arsenic pentasulfide forms a thioarsenate anion, [AsS4]3−, which contain As(V) centres.

References

Arsenic(V) compounds
Sulfides